Kirsimarja Koskinen (born 11 April 1969) is a Finnish taekwondo practitioner. She was born in Helsinki.

Career
Koskinen won a silver medal at the 1990 European championships, and bronze medal in 1994 and 1996. She participated at the World Taekwondo Championships eight times, first time in 1989. She competed at the 2000 Summer Olympics in Sydney.

References

External links

1969 births
Living people
Finnish female taekwondo practitioners
Olympic taekwondo practitioners of Finland
Taekwondo practitioners at the 2000 Summer Olympics
Sportspeople from Helsinki